A bronze statue of the American politician Edward Lewis ("Bob") Bartlett by Felix de Weldon is installed at the United States Capitol in Washington, D.C., as part of the National Statuary Hall Collection. The statue was gifted by the U.S. state of Alaska in 1971.

The statue is one of three that De Weldon has had placed in the Collection.

References

External links
 

1971 establishments in Washington, D.C.
Bronze sculptures in Washington, D.C.
Monuments and memorials in Washington, D.C.
Bartlett
Sculptures of men in Washington, D.C.